The iPhone 13 Pro and iPhone 13 Pro Max are smartphones designed, developed and marketed by Apple Inc. They were the flagship smartphones in the fifteenth generation of the iPhone, succeeding the iPhone 12 Pro and iPhone 12 Pro Max respectively. The devices were unveiled alongside the iPhone 13 and iPhone 13 Mini at an Apple Special Event at Apple Park in Cupertino, California on September 14, 2021, and became available ten days later, on September 24. They were discontinued on September 7, 2022, as well as the iPhone 11 and iPhone 12 mini, following the announcement of the iPhone 14 and iPhone 14 Pro.

Major upgrades over its predecessor include improved battery life, improved cameras and computational photography, rack focus for video in a new "Cinematic Mode" at 1080p 30 fps, Apple ProRes video recording, a new A15 Bionic system on a chip, and a variable 10–120 Hz display, marketed as ProMotion.

History

Before announcement
The successor to the iPhone 12 Pro models began in development to make the size of the notch 20% smaller as thanks to the front-firing speaker placed into the upper edge from the True-Depth sensor housing and utilizing the display refresh rate up to 120 Hz for smoother motion found. According to the early released rumors, the color options of the iPhone 13 Pro models were including Sunset Gold (a new Gold color option), Rosé (a rename of Gold), Pearl (rename of the Silver) and Matte Black. However, Apple Inc. announced that no Sunset Gold color option of the iPhone 13 Pro and iPhone 13 Pro Max would be unveiled, which Sierra Blue color option of the iPhone 13 Pro and iPhone 13 Pro Max would be instead unveiled on the September Event.

After announcement
The iPhone 13 Pro and iPhone 13 Pro Max were officially announced alongside the ninth-generation iPad, 6th generation iPad Mini, Apple Watch Series 7, iPhone 13, and iPhone 13 Mini by a virtual press event filmed and recorded at Apple Park in Cupertino, California on September 14, 2021. Pre-orders began on September 17 at 5:00 AM PST. Pricing starts at US$999 for the iPhone 13 Pro and US$1099 for the iPhone 13 Pro Max, the same as their respective previous generations.

In March 2023, Apple started selling refurbished iPhone 13 Pro models starting at $759.

Design 

The iPhone 13 Pro and iPhone 13 Pro Max's design is mostly unchanged from their respective predecessors. However, the rear camera module now covers a larger area due to the larger lenses. The Face ID and camera module on the front display, or "notch", is now 20% smaller than in previous generations.

The iPhone 13 Pro and 13 Pro Max are available in five colors: Silver, Graphite, Gold, Sierra Blue, and Alpine Green. Sierra Blue is a new color replacing Pacific Blue.

On March 8, 2022, at Apple's Special Event "Peek Performance", Apple revealed a new Alpine Green color option, which became available on March 18, 2022.

Specifications

Hardware 
The iPhone 13 Pro and Pro Max use an Apple-designed A15 Bionic processor featuring a 16-core neural engine, 6-core CPU (with 2 performance cores and 4 efficiency cores), and 5-core GPU. The A15 Bionic also contains a next-generation image processor.

More 5G bands are available to support more carriers, especially outside the US.

Display 
The iPhone 13 Pro has a 6.06 inch (154 mm) (marketed as ) OLED display with a resolution of 2532 × 1170 pixels (2.9 megapixels) at 460 PPI, while the iPhone 13 Pro Max has a 6.68 inch (170 mm) (marketed as ) OLED display with a resolution of 2778 × 1284 pixels (3.5 megapixels) at 458 PPI. Both models have the Super Retina XDR OLED display with improved typical brightness up to 1,000 nits from 800 nits, and max brightness up to 1,200 nits, and for the first time in an iPhone, a variable 10–120 Hz ProMotion display, which can also go as low as 10 Hz to preserve battery and the term was previously used on the iPad Pro (2nd Generation) and later models.

Batteries 
Apple claims up to 1.5 more hours of battery life on the iPhone 13 Pro, and 2.5 more hours on the 13 Pro Max than their respective predecessors. Rated capacities are 11.97 Wh (3,095 mAh) on the 13 Pro an increase from the 10.78 Wh (2,815 mAh) battery found in the iPhone 12 Pro, while the 13 Pro Max is rated at 16.75 Wh (4,352 mAh) another increase from the 14.13 Wh (3,687 mAh) battery found in the iPhone 12 Pro Max. Both models can charge with MagSafe up to 15 W, Qi wireless charging up to 7.5 W, and Lightning up to 20-23 W For the (Pro), 20-27 W for the (Pro Max).

Cameras 
The iPhone 13 Pro features four cameras: one front-facing camera for selfie and three rear-facing cameras which includes a telephoto, wide, and ultra-wide camera. The rear-facing cameras all contain larger sensors than the iPhone 12 Pro, allowing for more light-gathering. The wide and ultra-wide also have larger apertures to capture more light and increase low-light performance. The ultra-wide camera also has autofocus for the first time. The 77 mm telephoto has a smaller aperture than the 12 Pro's, but has the advantage of being able to use Night Mode for the first time. The larger telephoto also increases the digital zoom capability to 15x.

The cameras use Apple's latest computational photography engine, called Smart HDR 4. Smart HDR 4 processes recognized faces in photos separately using local adjustments. Users can also choose from a range of photographic styles during capture, including rich contrast, vibrant, warm, and cool. Apple clarifies this is different than a filter because it works intelligently with the image processing algorithm during capture to apply local adjustments to an image.

The camera app contains a new mode called Cinematic Mode, which allows users to rack focus between subjects and create a shallow depth of field using software algorithms. It is supported on wide, telephoto, and front-facing cameras in 1080p at 30 fps. Apple also added in iOS 15.1 the ability to record in Apple ProRes 4K at 30 fps and 1080p at 60 fps for models with at least 256 GB of storage, however base models with 128 GB of storage will be limited to ProRes recording at 1080p at 30 fps.

The camera features a macro mode that can focus as close as 2 centimeters from a subject. It utilizes the autofocus from the ultra-wide camera and is automatically enabled when close enough to a subject.

Software 

iPhone 13 Pro and iPhone 13 Pro Max are preinstalled with iOS 15 at launch.

Reception 
The iPhone 13 Pro and iPhone 13 Pro Max were praised by reviewers and journalists for its marked improvement in battery life, improved set of cameras, and the addition of ProMotion to the iPhone. The devices have repeatedly been called the best camera in a smartphone.

See also 
 Comparison of smartphones
 History of the iPhone
 List of iOS devices
 Timeline of iPhone models

References

External links 
  – official site

IOS
Mobile phones introduced in 2021
Products and services discontinued in 2022
 
Mobile phones with 4K video recording
Mobile phones with multiple rear cameras
Discontinued flagship smartphones